Dicerandra radfordiana, or Radford's balm, is an annual species of Dicerandra native to Eastern Georgia. It is found along the Altamaha River bluffs where deep, well drained sands are common. Only 2 populations are currently known, with one on public land and another, on private land, where it is protected by a conservation easement. The size of each population varies from year to year depending on the amount of rainfall

References

Flora of the Southeastern United States
radfordiana